Several special routes of U.S. Route 401 exist, from South Carolina to North Carolina. In order from south to north, separated by type, they are as follows.

Business loops

Laurinburg business loop

U.S. Route 401 Business (US 401 Bus) was established in 1960 as a renumbering of US 401A through downtown Laurinburg, it has remained unchanged since.

Raeford business loop

U.S. Route 401 Business (US 401 Bus) first started unofficially in 1954, US 15A was rerouted onto a bypass around Raeford, the old alignment through downtown was unnumbered until around the early 1960s, when it became US 401 Business.  The route follows Harris Avenue, Main Street, and Central Avenue.

Fayetteville business loop

U.S. Route 401 Business (US 401 Bus) was established in late 1960s from a renumbering of US 401, this business loop goes through Fayetteville via Raeford Road, Robeson Street, Martin Luther King Jr Freeway, and Ramsey Street.

Rolesville business loop

U.S. Route 401 Business (US 401 Bus) is a  business loop along Main Street, through downtown Rolesville. The Town of Rolesville had been planning this long time, since 1985, but the project never went through. U.S. 401 initially lead in and out of the town until its 2015 opening. Approved by AASHTO on May 29, 2014; its official establishment is dependent on the opening of the Rolesville bypass, which will be signed as U.S. 401.  On July 16, 2015, the Rolesville bypass opened.

Former business loops

Bennettsville business loop

U.S. Route 401 Business (US 401 Bus.) was a  business route of US 401 that traveled through Bennettsville via Main Street and Tyson Avenue. It was established in 1958, when mainline US 401 was bypassed south of Bennettsville; it followed the old alignment. By 1990, the highway was decommissioned with most being replaced by an extension of SC 385.

Former alternate routes

Laurinburg alternate route

U.S. Route 401 Alternate (US 401A) was established in 1957, when US 401 was re-established, it replaced US 15A alignment through downtown Laurinburg, via Main Street.  It was renumbered in 1960 into US 401 Business.

References

01-4
401 Banners
01-4
01-4